Stephenson Township is a civil township of Menominee County in the U.S. state of Michigan. The population was 716 at the 2000 census. The city of Stephenson is surrounded by the township but is administered autonomously.

Communities
Daggett was a community founded in 1876.  It was incorporated as a village in 1902 and is now within Daggett Township.

Geography

Demographics
As of the census of 2000, there were 716 people, 283 households, and 215 families residing in the township.  The population density was 17.6 per square mile (6.8/km).  There were 358 housing units at an average density of 8.8 per square mile (3.4/km).  The racial makeup of the township was 98.60% White, 0.28% Native American, and 1.12% from two or more races. Hispanic or Latino of any race were 0.28% of the population.

There were 283 households, out of which 31.1% had children under the age of 18 living with them, 66.4% were married couples living together, 5.3% had a female householder with no husband present, and 24.0% were non-families. 22.6% of all households were made up of individuals, and 11.0% had someone living alone who was 65 years of age or older.  The average household size was 2.53 and the average family size was 2.95.

In the township the population was spread out, with 25.4% under the age of 18, 7.5% from 18 to 24, 26.5% from 25 to 44, 23.5% from 45 to 64, and 17.0% who were 65 years of age or older.  The median age was 40 years. For every 100 females, there were 108.7 males.  For every 100 females age 18 and over, there were 108.6 males.

The median income for a household in the township was $33,000, and the median income for a family was $37,778. Males had a median income of $27,143 versus $20,625 for females. The per capita income for the township was $15,727.  About 7.4% of families and 9.8% of the population were below the poverty line, including 11.3% of those under age 18 and 12.8% of those age 65 or over.

References

Notes

Sources

Townships in Menominee County, Michigan
Marinette micropolitan area
Townships in Michigan